Transcription factor MafF is a bZip Maf transcription factor protein that in humans is encoded by the MAFF gene.

MafF is one of the small Maf proteins, which are basic region and leucine zipper (bZIP)-type transcription factors. The HUGO Gene Nomenclature Committee-approved gene name of MAFF is “v-maf avian musculoaponeurotic fibrosarcoma oncogene homolog F”.

Discovery 

MafF was first cloned and identified in chicken in 1993 as a member of the small Maf (sMaf) genes. MAFF has been identified in many vertebrates, including humans. There are three functionally redundant sMaf proteins in vertebrates, MafF, MafG, and MafK.

Structure 

MafF has a bZIP structure that consists of a basic region for DNA binding and a leucine zipper structure for dimer formation. Similar to other sMafs, MafF lacks any canonical transcriptional activation domains.

Expression 

MAFF is broadly but differentially expressed in various tissues. MAFF expression was detected in all 16 tissues examined by the human BodyMap Project, but relatively abundant in adipose, colon, lung, prostate and skeletal muscle tissues. Human MAFF gene is induced by proinflammatory cytokines, interleukin 1 beta and tumor necrosis factor in myometrial cells.

Function 

Because of sequence similarity, no functional differences have been observed among the sMafs in terms of their bZIP structures.  sMafs form homodimers by themselves and heterodimers with other specific bZIP transcription factors, such as CNC (cap 'n' collar) proteins [p45 NF-E2 (NFE2), Nrf1 (NFE2L1), Nrf2 (NFE2L2), and Nrf3 (NFE2L3)] and Bach proteins (BACH1 and BACH2).

Target genes 

sMafs regulate different target genes depending on their partners. For instance, the p45-NF-E2-sMaf heterodimer regulate genes responsible for platelet production. Nrf2-sMaf heterodimer regulates a battery of cytoprotective genes, such as antioxidant/xenobiotic metabolizing enzyme genes. The Bach1-sMaf heterodimer regulates the heme oxygenase-1 gene. In particular, it has been reported that MafF regulates the oxytocin receptor gene. The contribution of individual sMafs to the transcriptional regulation of their target genes has not yet been well examined.

Disease linkage

Loss of sMafs results in disease-like phenotypes as summarized in table below. Mice lacking MafF are seemingly healthy under laboratory conditions. However, mice lacking MafG exhibit mild neuronal phenotype and mild thrombocytopenia, mice lacking Mafg and one allele of Mafk (Mafg−/−::Mafk+/−) exhibit progressive neuronal degeneration, thrombocytopenia and cataract, and mice lacking MafG and MafK (Mafg−/−::Mafk−/−) exhibit more severe neuronal degeneration and die in the perinatal stage. Mice lacking MafF, MafG and MafK are embryonic lethal, demonstrating that MafF is indispensable for embryonic development. Embryonic fibroblasts that are derived from Maff−/−::Mafg-/−::Mafk−/− mice fail to activate Nrf2-dependent cytoprotective genes in response to stress.

In addition, accumulating evidence suggests that as partners of CNC and Bach proteins, sMafs are involved in the onset and progression of various human diseases, including neurodegeneration, arteriosclerosis and cancer.

See also 
 MAF (gene)

Notes

References

Further reading

External links 
 
 

Transcription factors